The Hanlin is an e-Reader, an electronic book (e-book) reading device.  The Hanlin v3 features a 6" (15 cm), 4-level grayscale electrophoretic display (E Ink material) with a resolution of 600×800 pixels (167 ppi), while the v3+ features a 16-level grayscale display. The Hanlin v5 Mini, features a 5" (15 cm), 8-level grayscale electrophoretic display (E Ink material) with a resolution of 600×800 pixels (200 ppi). The device runs a Linux-based OS.

The device is manufactured by the JinKe Electronic Company in China. It is rebranded by various OEMs and sold under the names Bebook, Walkbook, lBook, Iscriptum, Papyre, EZ Reader, Koobe and ECO Reader.

The Hanlin eReader works best with EPUB, RTF, FB2, and Mobipocket documents, because of their simplicity, interoperability, and low CPU processing requirements. These files also offer more zoom levels, and more options like search, landscape mode, and text to speech than with PDF, DOC, HTML, or TXT.

It also uses JinKe's proprietary WOLF format (file extension .wol).

Specifications of Hanlin Models

Hardware
Size: 184 x 120.5 x 9.9 mm
Weight: 210 g, battery included (160 gram for BeBook mini)
Screen: 90 x 120 mm (3.54 x 4.72 inches)
600x800 pixels / black and white, 4/16 gray-scale 166 dpi for Hanlin v3/v3+ and 8 gray-scale 200 dpi for Hanlin v5
Daylight readable / No backlight / Portrait and landscape mode
SDRAM memory: 32 MB for the v3, 64 MB for the v3+/v6
SD card (supports SDIO) (v3 supports up to 4GB, v5 supports SDHC up to 16GB (supports 32GB unofficially)
Connectivity: USB 1.1 (client only) for Hanlin v3 and USB 2.0 for Hanlin v3+/v5

Software
Operating system: Linux
Document formats: PDF, TXT, RTF, DOC, HTML Help, FB2, HTML, WOL, DJVU, LIT, EPUB, PPT, Mobipocket.
Archives support: ZIP, RAR.
Supported image format: TIFF, JPEG, GIF, BMP, PNG.
Supported sound format: MP3.

Product Version
V Series: V2, V3, V3+, V5, V60, V90
A Series: A6, A9, A90

See also
 List of e-book readers

External links
 http://www.bebook.net.au - Australian reseller. BeBook version includes both Bebook1 and Mini models

References

Electronic paper technology
Dedicated ebook devices
Linux-based devices
Chinese brands